The Hawaiian hopseed looper moth (Scotorythra paratactis) is a species of moth in the family Geometridae. It is endemic to the island of Oahu in Hawaii.

The larvae feed on Dodonaea viscosa.

References

IUCN Red List of all current Threatened Species

Endemic moths of Hawaii
Biota of Oahu
Taxonomy articles created by Polbot